The following table is an overview of all national records in the 100 metres.

Men's outdoor

Women's outdoor

References

 
100 metres